The Hamzanama (Persian/Urdu:  Hamzenâme, Epic of Hamza) or Dastan-e-Amir Hamza (Persian/Urdu:  Dâstâne Amir Hamze, "Adventures of Amir Hamza") narrates the legendary exploits of Amir Hamza, or Hamza ibn Abdul-Muttalib, an uncle of Muhammad.  Most of the stories are extremely fanciful, "a continuous series of romantic interludes, threatening events, narrow escapes, and violent acts". The Hamzanama chronicles the fantastic adventures of Hamza as he and his band of heroes fight against the enemies of Islam.

The stories, from a long-established oral tradition, were written down in Persian, the language of the courts of Persianate societies, in multiple volumes presumably in the era of Mahmud of Ghazni. In the West, the work is best known for the enormous illustrated manuscript commissioned by the Mughal emperor Akbar about 1562. The text augmented the story, as traditionally told in dastan performances. The dastan (storytelling tradition) about Amir Hamza persists far and wide up to Bengal and Arakan, as the Mughal Empire controlled those territories. The longest version of the Hamzanama exists in Urdu and contains 46 volumes comprising over 45,000 pages.

History: versions and translations

Iranian origins
Dastan and qissa in Persian both mean “story,” and the narrative genre they refer to goes back to medieval Iran. William L. Hanaway, who has made a close study of Persian dastans, describes them as “popular romances” that were “created, elaborated, and transmitted” by professional storytellers. At least as early as the ninth century, it was a widely popular form of story-telling. Dastan-narrators told tales of heroic romance and adventure- stories about gallant princes and their encounters with evil kings, enemy champions, demons, magicians, jinns, divine emissaries, tricky secret agents called ayyars, and beautiful princesses who might be human or of the Pari (“fairy”) race. Their ultimate subject matter was always simple: “razm o bazm,” the battlefield and the elegant courtly life, war and love. Hanaway mentions five principal dastans surviving from the pre-Safavid (i.e., fifteenth century and earlier) period: those that grew up around the adventures of the world-conqueror Alexander, the great Persian king Darius, the Prophet Muhammad’s uncle Hamza, the legendary king Firoz Shah, and a trickster-hero named Samak the Ayyar. Of all the early dastans, the Hamza romance is thought to be the oldest.

The romance of Hamza goes back – or at least claims to go back – to the life of its hero, Hamza ibn Abdul-Muttalib, the paternal uncle of the Prophet, who was slain in the Battle of Uhud (625 CE) by a slave instigated by a woman named Hind bint Utbah, whose relatives Hamzah had killed at Badr. Hind bint Utbah then went to the battlefield and mutilated the dead Hamzah's body, cutting off his ears and nose, cutting out his liver and chewing it to fulfill the vow of vengeance she had made. Later, when the Prophet conquered Mecca, Hind bint Utbah accepted Islam, and was pardoned.

It has been argued that the romance of Hamza may actually have begun with the adventures of a Persian namesake of the original Hamza: Hamza ibn Abdullah, a member of a radical Islamic sect called the Kharijites, who was the leader of a rebel movement against the caliph Harun al-Rashid and his successors. This Persian Hamzah lived in the early ninth century, and seems to have been a dashing rebel whose colorful exploits gave rise to many stories. He was known to have fought against the Abbasid caliph-monarch and the local warriors from Sistan, Makran, Sindh and Khorasan are said to have joined him in the battle, which lasted till the Caliph died. After which Hamza left, inexplicably, for Sarandip (Ceylon) and China, leaving behind 5000 warriors to protect the powerless against the powerful. His disciples wrote the account of his travels and expeditions in a book Maghazi-e-Amir Hamza, which was the original source of Dastan-e-Amir Hamza. As these stories circulated, they eventually transferred to the earlier Hamza, who was an orthodox Muslim champion acceptable to all.

The seventeenth-century Zubdat ur-rumuz actually gives two conflicting origin-stories. The first is that after Hamza's death, ladies living near the Prophet's house told praising anecdotes to get the Prophet's attention—and that one Masud Makki then produced the first written version of these stories to divert the Meccans from their hostility to the Prophet. The second was that  wise courtiers devised the romance to cure a brain fever suffered by one of the Abbasid caliphs. The 1909 Indo-Persian version also gives two conflicting sources. The first is that the dastan was invented by Abbas, who used to tell it to the Prophet, his nephew, to cheer him up with stories of his other uncle's glory. The second is that the dastan was invented during the reign of Muawiyah I (661-79) to keep loyalty to the Prophet's family alive among the people, despite official hostility and vilification.

In his study of the Arabian epic, Malcolm Lyons discusses Sirat Hamzat al-Pahlawan, which is a parallel cycle of the nature of Amir Hamza in Arab with similarities of names and places like Anushirwan that corresponds to Nausheravan, the vizier Buzurjmihr who is synonymous to Buzurjmehr, the Persian capital Midan and also jinn of Jabal Qaf. But it is difficult to prove who has borrowed from whom.

The Hamza story soon grew, ramified, traveled and gradually spread over immense areas of the Muslim world. It was translated into Arabic; there is a twelfth-century Georgian version, and a fifteenth-century Turkish version twenty-four volumes long. It also exists in sixteenth-century Malay and Javanese versions, and in Balinese and Sudanese ones as well. Moreover, even in Iran the story continued to develop over time: by the mid-nineteenth century the Hamza romance had grown to such an extent that it was printed in a version about twelve hundred very large pages in length. By this time the dastan was often called Rumuz-e Hamza (The Subtleties of Hamza). And by this time, the Hamza romance had made itself conspicuously at home in India as well.

Evolving Indian versions: Persian

Annemarie Schimmel judges that the Hamza story “must have been popular in the Indian subcontinent from the days of Mahmud of Ghazni in the early eleventh century. The earliest solid evidence, however, seems to be a late-fifteenth-century set of paintings that illustrate the story; these were crudely executed, possibly in Jaunpur, perhaps for a not-too-affluent patron.

In 1555, Babur noted with disapproval that the leading literary figure of Khurasan had recently “wasted his time” in composing an imitation of the cycle. The great emperor Akbar (1556-1605), far from sharing his grandfather's attitude, conceived and supervised the immense task of illustrating the whole romance. As Akbar's court chronicler tells us, Hamza's adventures were “represented in twelve volumes, and clever painters made the most astonishing illustrations for no less than one thousand and four hundred passages of the story.” The illustrated manuscript thus created became the supreme achievement of Mughal art: “of all the loot carried off from Delhi by Nadir Shah in 1739 (including the Peacock Throne), it was only the Hamza-nama, ‘painted with images that defy the imagination,’ that Emperor Muhammad Shah pleaded to have returned.”

The Hamza story left traces in the Deccan as well. One Persian romance-narrator, Haji Qissah-Khvan Hamadani, records his arrival in 1612 at Hyderabad, at the court of Sultan Abdullah Qutb Shah (1611-72) of Golconda. The Haji writes, “I had brought with me a number of manuscripts of the Rumuz-e Hamza. When I presented them in the king’s service, I was ordered, ‘Prepare a summary of them.’ In obedience to this order this book Zubdat ur-rumuz (The Cream of the Rumuz) has been prepared.” At least two other seventeenth-century Indo-Persian Hamza manuscripts survive, dated AH 1096 [1684-5] and AH 1099 [1687-8], as well as various undated and later ones.

In the course of countless retellings before faithful audiences, the Indo-Persian Hamzah story seems to have grown generally longer and more elaborate throughout the seventeenth and eighteenth centuries. By the eighteenth century, the Hamza story was so well-known in India that it inspired an indigenous Indo-Persian imitation, the massive Bostan-e Khiyal (Garden of “Khiyal”) by Mir Muhammad Taqi. By the nineteenth century, however, Persian as an Indian language was in a slow decline, for its political and cultural place was being taken by the rapidly developing modern languages. It is in these languages that the dastan found a hospitable environment to survive and flourish.

Evolving Indian versions: Urdu

The Hamza romance spread gradually, usually in its briefer and less elaborate forms, into a number of the modern languages of South Asia. Pashto and Sindhi were particularly hospitable to the Hamza story, and at least in Pashto it continues to flourish today, with printed pamphlet versions being produced. In Bengali it was popular among Muslims as early as the eighteenth century, in a long verse romance called Amirhamjar puthi, which its authors, Fakir Garibullah and Saiyad Hamja, described as a translation from the Persian. This romance was printed repeatedly in pamphlet form in the nineteenth century, and even occasionally in the twentieth. Various Hindi versions were produced too—but above all, the story of Hamza flourished in Urdu.

The earliest Hamza retelling in Urdu exists in a late Dakhani prose version called Qissa-e jang-e amir Hamza (Qissa of the War of Amir Hamza) (1784). Very little is known about this work's background. It was probably translated from a Persian text. In 1801, Khalil Ali Khan Ashk, a member of the Hindustani department of the famous Fort William College in Calcutta, composed the earliest printed version of the dastan in Urdu: the 500-page Dastan-e amir Hamza, consisting of twenty-two dastans, or chapters, grouped into four “volumes.”

Ashk claims that the story he is telling goes back to the time of Mahmud of Ghazni, in the early eleventh century; he implies that his present text is a translation, or at least a rendering, of the written, presumably Persian text that the distinguished dastan-narrators of Mahmud's court first set down. Ashk also claims that his sources, the narrators of Mahmud's court, compiled fourteen volumes of Hamza's adventures. However, we have no evidence that Mahmud of Ghazni ever sponsored the production of such a work. Gyan Chand Jain thinks that in fact Ashk based his version on the Dakhani Qissa-e jang-e amir Hamza because his plot agrees in many important particulars with the early Persian Qissa-e Hamza, though it disagrees in many others.

However, the most popular version of the dastan in Urdu was that of Aman Ali Khan Bahadur Ghalib Lakhnavi published by Hakim Mohtasham Elaih Press, Calcutta in 1855. In 1860s, one of the early publications of Munshi Nawal Kishore, the legendary publisher from Lucknow, was Ashk's Dastan-e amir Hamza. Nawal Kishore eventually replaced Ashk's version with a revised and improved Dastan-e amir Hamza (1871), explaining to the public that the Ashk version was marred by its “archaic idioms and convoluted style.” Munshi Nawal Kishore commissioned Maulvi Syed Abdullah Bilgrami to revise Ali Khan Bahadur Ghalib's translation and published it in 1871. This version proved extraordinarily successful. The Bilgrami version has almost certainly been more often reprinted, and more widely read, than any other in Urdu. In 1887 Syed Tasadduq Husain, a proof reader at Nawal Kishore Press, revised and embellished this edition. In the twentieth century, Abdul Bari Aasi rearranged this version by removing all the couplets from it and toning down the melodramatic scenes.

Owing to the popularity of the Ashk and Bilgrami versions in Urdu, Nawal Kishore also brought out in 1879 a counterpart work in Hindi called Amir Hamza ki dastan, by Pandits Kalicharan and Maheshdatt. This work was quite an undertaking in its own right: 520 large pages of typeset Devanagari script, in a prose adorned not with elegant Persian expressions but with exactly comparable Sanskritisms, and interspersed not with Persian verse forms but with Indic ones like kavitt, soratha, and chaupai. The Amir Hamza ki dastan, with its assimilation of a highly Islamic content into a self-consciously Sanskritized form, offers a fascinating early glimpse of the development of Hindi. The heirs of Nawal Kishore apparently published a 662-page Hindi version of the dastan as late as 1939.

During this same period Nawal Kishore added a third version of the Hamza story: a verse rendering of the romance, a new masnavi by Tota Ram Shayan called Tilism-e shayan ma ruf bah dastan-e amir Hamza published in 1862. At 30,000 lines, it was the longest Urdu masnavi ever written in North India, with the exception of versions of the Arabian Nights. Yet Shayan is said to have composed it in only six months. This version too apparently found a good sale, for by 1893 Nawal Kishore was printing it for the sixth time.

In 1881, Nawal Kishore finally began publishing his own elaborate multi-volume Hamza series. He hired Muhammad Husain Jah, Ahmad Husain Qamar, and Tasadduq Husain, the most famous Lucknow dastan-narrators, to compose the stories. This version of the Dastan-e amir Hamza was an extraordinary achievement: not only the crowning glory of the Urdu dastan tradition, but also surely the longest single romance cycle in world literature, since the forty-six volumes average 900 pages each. Publication of the cycle began with the first four volumes of Tilism-e hoshruba ("The Stunning Tilism") by Muhammad Husain Jah; these volumes were published between 1883 and 1890, after which Jah had differences with Nawal Kishore and left the Press. These four volumes by Jah proved immensely popular, and are still considered the heart of the cycle. After Jah, the two main architects of the cycle, Ahmad Husain Qamar (nineteen volumes) and Tasadduq Husain (nineteen volumes) took over the work from 1892 to its completion around 1905.

These writers were not the original creators of the tales and by the time the Nawal Kishore Press began publishing them, they had already evolved in their form and structure. As these dastans were mainly meant for oral rendition, the storytellers added local colours to these tales. Storytelling had become a popular craft in India by nineteenth century. The storytellers narrated their long winding tales of suspense, mystery, adventure, magic, fantasy, and the marvellous rolled into one to their inquisitive audiences. Each day, the session would end at a point where the curious public would be left to wonder as to what happened next. Some of the most famous storytellers of Hamza dastan were Mir Ahmad Ali (belonged to Lucknow but later moved to Rampur), Mir Qasim Ali, Hakim Sayed Asghar Ali Khan (he came to Rampur during the tenure of Nawab Mohammad Saeed Khan i.e. 1840–1855), Zamin Ali Jalal Lucknowi, Munshi Amba Prasad Rasa Lucknowi (a disciple of Mir Ahmad Ali who later converted to Islam and was rechristened Abdur Rahman), his son Ghulam Raza, Haider Mirza Tasawwur Lucknowi (a disciple of Asghar Ali), Haji Ali Ibn Mirza Makkhoo Beg, his son Syed Husain Zaidi and Murtuza Husain Visaal.

The final arrangement of the cycle was into eight daftars or sections. The first four daftars – the two-volume Naushervan nama (The Book of Naushervan); the one-volume Kochak bakhtar (The Lesser West); the one-volume Bala bakhtar (The Upper West); and the two-volume Iraj nama (The Book of Iraj) – were closer to the Persian romance, and were linked more directly to Hamza's own adventures, especially those of the earlier part of his life. Then came the fifth daftar, the Tilism-e hoshruba itself, begun by Jah (four volumes) and completed by Qamar (three volumes). The remaining three daftars, though they make up the bulk of the cycle in quantity, emphasize the adventures of Hamza's sons and grandsons, and are generally of less literary excellence. Though no library in the world has a full set of the forty-six volumes, a microfilm set at the Center for Research Libraries in Chicago is on the verge of completion.

This immense cycle claims itself as a translation of a (mythical) Persian original written by Faizi, one of the great literary figures of Akbar's court; this claim is made repeatedly on frontispieces, and here and there within the text. Like this purported Persian original, the Urdu version thus contains exactly eight daftars - even though as the Urdu cycle grew, the eighth daftar had to become longer and longer until it contained twenty-seven volumes.

This astonishing treasure-house of romance, which at its best contains some of the finest narrative prose ever written in Urdu, is considered the delight of its age; many of its volumes were reprinted again and again, well into the twentieth century. Although towards the end of the nineteenth century dastans had reached an extraordinary peak of popularity, the fate of dastan literature was sealed by the first quarter of the twentieth century. By the time of the great dastan-narrator Mir Baqir Ali's death in 1928, dastan volumes were being rejected by the educated elite in favor of Urdu and Hindi novels—many of which were in fact very dastan-like.

Modern translations
Two English language translations have been published based on The Ghalib Lakhnavi and Abdullah Bilgrami version (1871) published by Munshi Nawal Kishore press. The first is an abridged translation called The Romance Tradition in Urdu by Frances Pritchett of Columbia University. It is available in an expanded version on the website of the translator.  In 2008 Musharraf Ali Farooqi, a Pakistani-Canadian author, translated the Lakhnavi/Bilgrami version into English as The Adventures of Amir Hamza: Lord of the Auspicious Planetary Conjunction. He took seven years to translate this thousand-page adventure. Farooqi has done a very close translation of the text without abridging the ornate passages.

A Pakistani author Maqbool Jahangir wrote Dastan-e-Amir Hamza for children in the Urdu language. His version contains 10 volumes and was published by Ferozsons (also Ferozsons Publishers).

Synopsis

Dastan-e-Amir Hamza
The collection of Hamza stories begins with a short section describing events that set the stage for the appearance of the central hero. In this case, the place is Ctesiphon (Madain) in Iraq, and the initial protagonist is Buzurjmehr, a child of humble parentage who displays both a remarkable ability to decipher ancient scripts and great acumen in political affairs. By luck and calculated design, Buzurjmehr displaces the current vizier, and attaches himself first to the reigning king, Kobad, and then to his successor, Naushervan. 

Nonetheless, a bitter rivalry has been seeded, for the widow of the wicked dead vizier bears a son she names Bakhtak Bakhtyar, and he in turn becomes a lifelong nemesis of both Hamza and Buzurjmehr. The latter soon relates a vision to Naushervan that a child still in embryo in Arabia will eventually bring about his downfall; Naushervan responds in Herod-like fashion, dispatching Buzurjmihr to Arabia with an order to kill all pregnant women. Emerging unscathed by this terrible threat are Hamza and Amar Umayya, who is destined to be Hamza's faithful companion. 
Unlike most Persian heroes, Hamza is not born to royalty, but is nonetheless of high birth, the son of the chief of Mecca. An auspicious horoscope prophesies an illustrious future for him. Hamza shows an early aversion to idol-worship, and with the aid of a supernatural instructor, develops a precocious mastery of various martial arts. He soon puts these skills to good use, defeating upstart warriors in individual combat, preventing the Yemeni army from interdicting tribute to Naushervan, and defending Mecca from predatory – but not religious – foes. Naushervan learns of these sundry exploits, and invites Hamza to his court, where he promises him his daughter Mihr Nigar in marriage. The girl is thrilled at this match, for she has long yearned for Hamza, and has had one soulful but chaste evening with him.

First, however, Naushervan sends Hamza to Ceylon to fend off a threat from Landhaur, and thence onto Greece, where Bakhtak Bakhtyar has insidiously poisoned the kings against him. Hamza, of course, proves his mettle in these and other tests, but his marriage to Mihr Nigar is forestalled by the treacherous Gostaham, who arranges her nuptials with another. Hamza is seriously wounded in battle with Zubin, Mihr Nigar's prospective groom, and is rescued by the vazir of the Pari king Shahpal, ruler of the realm of Qaf. In return for this act of kindness, Hamza gallantly agrees to subdue the rebellious elephant-eared Devs who have seized Shahpal's kingdom. The whole expedition to Qaf is to take eighteen days, and Hamza insists on fulfilling this debt of honor before his wedding. However, he is destined to be detained in Qaf not for eighteen days, but for eighteen years.

At this point, the shape of the story radically changes: adventures take place simultaneously in Qaf and on earth, and the dastan moves back and forth in reporting them. While Hamza in Qaf is killing Devs, trying to deal with Shahpal's powerful daughter Asman Pari whom he has been forced to marry, and looking desperately for ways to get home, Amar in the (human) World is holding Hamza's forces together, moving from fort to fort, and trying to defend Mihr Nigar from Naushervan's efforts to recapture her.

While Hamza and his allies navigate various shoals of courtly intrigue, they also wage a prolonged war against infidels. Although the ostensible goal of these conflicts is to eradicate idolatry and convert opponents to Islam, the latter is usually related with little fanfare at the end of the episode. Champions often proclaim their faith in Allah as they take to the battlefield, and sometimes reproach unbelievers for failing to grasp that the Muslims' past military success is prima facie evidence of the righteousness of their cause.

After eighteen years, much suffering, and more divine intervention, Hamza does finally escape from Qaf; he makes his way home, and is reunited with his loyal companions. In the longest and most elaborate scene in the dastan, he marries the faithful Mihr Nigar. But by this time, the story is nearing its end. About two-fifths of the text deals with Hamza's early years, about two-fifths with the years in Qaf, and only one-fifth with the time after his return. The remaining years of Hamza's long life are filled with activity; some of it is fruitful, but usually in a kind of equivocal way. Hamza and Mihr Nigar have one son, Qubad, who is killed at an early age; soon afterwards, Mihr Nigar herself is killed.

Hamza, distraught, vows to spend the rest of his life tending her tomb. But his enemies pursue him there, kidnap him, and torment him; his old companions rally round to rescue him, and his old life reclaims him. He fights against Naushervan and others, travels, has adventures, marries a series of wives. His sons and grandsons by various wives appear one by one, perform heroic feats, and frequently die young. He and Amar have a brief but traumatic quarrel. Toward the very end of his life he must enter the Dark Regions, pursuing a series of frightful cannibal kings; while their incursions are directly incited by Naushervan, Amar's own act of vicarious cannibalism seems somehow implicated as well.
Almost all Hamza's army is lost in the Dark Regions, and he returns in a state of grief and desolation. Finally, he is summoned by the Prophet, his nephew, back to Mecca to beat off an attack by the massed infidel armies of the world. He succeeds, losing all his companions except Amar in the process, but dies at the hands of the woman Hindah, whose son he had killed. She devours his liver, cuts his body into seventy pieces, then hastily accepts Islam to save herself. The Prophet and the angels pray over every piece of the body, and Hamzah is rewarded with the high celestial rank of Commander of the Faithful.

Tilism-e hoshruba

In this new tale, Amir Hamza's adventures bring him to Hoshruba, a magical world or "tilism". The tilism of Hoshruba was conjured by sorcerers in defiance of Allah and the laws of the physical world. However, being a creation of magic, Hoshruba is not a permanent world. At the moment of its creation a person was named who would unravel this magical world at an appointed time using the tilism key.
With the passage of time, the whereabouts of the tilism key were forgotten, and the usurper Afrasiyab became the Master of the Tilism and Emperor of Sorcerers. Afrasiyab and his sorceress Empress Heyrat ruled over Hoshruba's three regions named Zahir the Manifest, Batin the Hidden, and Zulmat the Dark, which contained countless dominions and smaller tilisms governed by sorcerer kings and sorceress queens, and where the dreaded Seven Monsters of the Grotto lurked.

Emperor Afrasiyab was among the seven immortal sorcerers of Hoshruba who could not be killed while their counterparts lived. His fortune came to reveal itself on the palms of his hands. His left hand warned him of inauspicious moments and the right hand revealed auspicious ones. Whenever anyone called out his name in the tilism, Afrasiyab's magic alerted him to the call. He possessed the Book of Sameri that contained an account of every event inside and outside the tilism. Afrasiyab used a magic mirror that projected his body into his court during his absence, and many magic doubles who replaced him when he was in imminent danger. Besides sorcerers and sorceresses, the emperor also commanded magic slaves and magic slave girls who fought at his command and performed any and all tasks assigned them.

As Hoshruba's time neared its end, Emperor Afrasiyab resolved to defend his empire and tilism, and foil the conqueror of the tilism when he appeared. The story of Hoshruba opens where the false god Laqa—an eighty-five-foot-tall, pitch-black giant – and one of Amir Hamza's foremost enemies – is in flight after suffering a fresh defeat at Amir Hamza's hands. He and his supporters arrive near Hoshruba and solicit the aid of the Emperor of Sorcerers.

Before long, Amir Hamza's armies pursuing Laqa find themselves at war with Afrasiyab and his army of sorcerers. When hostilities break out Amir Hamza's grandson, Prince Asad, is the designated conqueror of the tilism of Hoshruba. Prince Asad sets out at the head of a magnificent army to conquer Hoshruba. With him are five matchless tricksters headed by the prince of tricksters, the incomparable Amar Ayyar, whose native wit, and wondrous talents are a match for the most powerful sorcerer's spells.

Upon learning of Prince Asad's entry into the tilism with his army, Afrasiyab dispatches a number of sorcerers and five beautiful trickster girls to foil his mission. When the trickster girls kidnap the prince, Amar Ayyar and his band of misfits continue the mission of the conqueror of the tilism with the help of Heyrat's sister, Bahar Jadu, a powerful sorceress of the tilism, who Afrasiyab had banished from his court to please his wife.

Cultural Influence

The immense popularity of the dastan had a long-lasting effect on other forms of fictional narratives. The earliest novels in Urdu as well as Hindi often seem nothing more than simplified or bowdlerized forms of Dastans. Babu Devaki Nandan Khatri's Chandrakanta and Chandrakanta Santati and Ratan Nath Dhar Sarshar's Fasana-e-Azad are only the two most stellar examples of this genre. Chandrakanta bears the direct influence of dastans as witnessed in the case of eponymous protagonist Chandrakanta who is trapped in a tilism and the presence of notable ayyars. The dastan also influenced Munshi Premchand (1880-1936) who was fascinated and later on inspired by the stories of Tilism-e hoshruba that he heard at the tobacconist shop in his childhood days. The conventions of the dastan narrative also conditioned Urdu theatre: the trickster Ayyar, permanent friend of Hamza provided the convention of the hero's [comic] sidekick that achieved culmination in the Hindi cinema of the sixties.

The story is also performed in Indonesian puppet theatre, where it is called Wayang Menak. Here, Hamza is also known as Wong Agung Jayeng Rana or Amir Ambyah.

Frances Pritchett's former student at Columbia University, Pasha Mohamad Khan, who currently teaches at McGill University, researches qissa/dastan (romances) and the art of dastan-goi (storytelling), including the Hamzanama.

Illustrated copy: Akbar's manuscript
Though the first Mughal Emperor, Babur, described the Hamzanama as "one long far-fetched lie; opposed to sense and nature", his grandson Akbar, who came to the throne at the age of fourteen, greatly enjoyed it.  He commissioned his court workshop to create an illustrated manuscript of the Hamzanama early in his reign (he was by then about twenty), which was conceived on such an unusually large scale that it took fourteen years, from about 1562 to 1577, to complete.  Apart from the text, it included 1400 full page Mughal miniatures of an unusually large size, nearly all painted on tightly woven cotton cloth. The work was bound in 14 volumes.  After the early pages, where various layouts were experimented with, one side of most folios has a painting, about 69 cm x 54 cm (approx. 27 x 20 inches) in size, done in a fusion of Persian and Mughal styles. On the other side is the text in Persian in Nasta'liq script, arranged so that the text is opposite the matching picture in most openings of the book.

The size of the commission was completely unprecedented, and stretched even the huge imperial workshop.  According to contemporary accounts, about thirty main artists were used, and over a hundred men worked on the various aspects of the book in all.  According to Badauni and Shahnawaz Khan the work of preparing the illustrations was supervised initially by Mir Sayyid Ali and subsequently by Abdus Samad, the former possibly being replaced as head of the workshop because the pace of production was too slow.  After seven years only four volumes were completed, but the new head was able to galvanize production and complete the ten volumes in another seven years, without any loss of quality. Indeed, "the later pages are the most exciting and innovative in the work".

The colophon of this manuscript is still missing. None of the folios of this manuscript so far found is signed, though many have been attributed to different artists.  Compared to Akbar's Tutinama, a smaller commission begun and completed while the Hamzanama commission was in progress, the manuscript shows a much greater fusion of the styles of Indian and Persian miniatures.  Though the elegance and finish may seem closer to Persian works, the compositional style and narrative drama owe more to Indian tradition.  Between them, these two manuscripts are the key works in the formation of the Mughal miniature style.

At some fairly early point, the manuscript became dispersed, and only a little over a hundred of the paintings survive. The largest group of 61 images is in the Museum of Applied Arts, Vienna (Österreichisches Museum für angewandte Kunst or MAK), with the rest spread over many collections. The Victoria and Albert Museum possesses 27 images, bought in Kashmir, while the British Museum and the Khalili Collection of Islamic Art each have one. The MAK organized in 2009 the exhibition GLOBAL:LAB, Art as a Message. Asia and Europe 1500-1700, which showed its whole holding of the Hamzanama.  Other recent exhibitions dedicated to the manuscript have been at the Victoria and Albert Museum in 2003 and in 2002/2003 at the Smithsonian in Washington D.C., which transferred to the Brooklyn Museum in New York.

Pages from Akbar's copy

Notes

References
 Beach, Milo Cleveland, Early Mughal painting, Harvard University Press, 1987, 
 "Grove", Oxford Art Online, "Indian sub., §VI, 4(i): Mughal ptg styles, 16th–19th centuries", restricted access.
 Titley, Norah M., Persian Miniature Painting, and its Influence on the Art of Turkey and India, 1983, University of Texas Press, 0292764847
 Farooqi, Musharraf Ali (2007), The Adventures of Amir Hamza (New York: Random House Modern Library).
 The Bustan of Amir Hamzah (the Malay version of the story)
 Musharraf Farooqi (2009), (transl.Tilism-e hoshruba, vol. 1 of Jah): Hoshruba, Book One: The Land and the Tilism, by Muhammad Husain Jah.
 Seyller, John (2002), The Adventures of Hamza, Painting and Storytelling in Mughal India, Freer Gallery of Art and Arthur M. Sackler Gallery, Smithsonian Institution, Washington, DC, in association with Azimuth Editions Limited, London,  (contains the most complete set of reproductions of Hamzanama paintings and text translations); online

Further reading
  (see index: p. 148-152; plate 7–8)

External links

 The Adventures of Amir Hamza - the first complete and unabridged translation of the Dastan-e Amir Hamza
 Online exhibit of The Adventures of Hamza at the Smithsonian Institution
 A Masterpiece of Sensuous Communication: The Hamzanama of Akbar (images in pdf file, Section II )
 Hamzanama at the Victoria & Albert Museum, London
 Frances Pritchett's website for 'The Romance Tradition in Urdu: The Adventures from the Dastan-e Amir Hamza

Indian painting
Oral tradition
16th-century paintings
16th-century books
16th-century Indian books
Mughal art
Islamic illuminated manuscripts
Asian objects in the Victoria and Albert Museum
Epic poems in Persian
Indian manuscripts